Qarah Omar (also Romanized as Qarah ‘Omar) is a village in Saruq Rural District, Takht-e Soleyman District, Takab County, West Azerbaijan Province, Iran. At the 2006 census, its population was 406, in 81 families.

References 

Populated places in Takab County